Marieme is a Senegalese-American singer-songwriter with a multi-octave voice whose music has R&B, pop and jazz influences. Her musical themes reflect her youth affected by war and her subsequent world travels.

She has released one EP, one acoustic visual EP, and her songs have been used in several television shows and in film.

Early life
Marieme Diop was born in Nouakchott, Mauritania, Africa where her father was an executive at a regional electrical company. When she was six months old, war broke out between that country and Senegal forcing her family to escape leaving behind a comfortable lifestyle and keeping nothing. Marieme and her siblings lived with her aunt in Senegal, while her parents moved to the Bronx, New York in the United States. The family reunited five years later in New York.

"I grew up in Senegal until I was seven years old. There was always music around, but it wasn't encouraged—I grew up in a very religious household. When I came to America, I found a box of CDs under my parents' bed. It was a surprise to me because I didn't think they listened to music. I found out later that my dad was the one who bought it because there was a discount at his job or something. There were CDs by Ace of Base, Mariah Carey, Whitney Houston, and more—about ten albums. I would put them on and cry because of the way the music made me feel. Mariah Carey's album changed my life. I was learning English through listening to music, which was a powerful connection. My assimilation to America was all through music. I was teased a lot for my skin color and for being straight from Africa."

At the University of Buffalo, Marieme studied journalism and communication, and even studied and interned in feature writing in London, United Kingdom. It was in high school when a jazz history class played Billie Holiday that she realized what she wanted to become, and did so with a vocal range of several octaves.

Marieme lives in both New York City, New York and Los Angeles, California.

Music career
In 2017, Marieme moved to Los Angeles, and two days after arriving, she wrote the song, "Leave"  with producer/songwriter Andy Rose. Shortly after, with three songs completed, she got a deal from Jason Markey of Universal Music Publishing Group. She started writing with producers such as Theron "Neff-U" Feemster, who has worked with Michael Jackson, Eminem, Justin Bieber, Dr.Dre, Ne-Yo.

Marieme released an eponymous EP in February 2018 on Caroline Records. The EP featured three songs, "Leave," "Be The Change," and "Ask For Help." Of the latter, she told Music in Africa: "In this society, we are faced with so much. As we learn more and more about ourselves and the human condition over time, it is very important to know our limits in order to be able to exceed them and be able to reach our true goal. Often, misplaced pride keeps us from moving forward, and in the song we meant not to be too proud and to be able to ask for help when we needed it. The most powerful way to do this is through music."

In April 2018, the Marieme song, "What's Cool" was included on the soundtrack for the Amy Schumer movie, I Feel Pretty. The album was released by Sony Music.

Caroline released a new Marieme song called "Tumblin’" in September 2018, which referenced the fall of a governmental system.

In October 2019, she began releasing a series of acoustic videos of the songs from the Marieme EP. The visual work preceded the release of her acoustic visual EP in January 2019.

Early in 2019, "Ask For Help" was used as the promotion for the nationwide season premiere of Iyanla: Fix My Life on Oprah's OWN Network, and an episode of the CBS mini-series The Red Line.

Marieme independently released a video for her song "Fi Moy Senegal" featuring Shaheed and Dixa of Alien Zik, both from Senegal. The song was issued to celebrate Senegal’s Independence Day in April 2019. Initially available on YouTube only in Senegal, it became popular enough to be made available internationally by the platform in June. The audio for "Fi Moy Senegal" was used by the Senegalese soccer team Les Lions in July 2019 as they competed for the African Cup of Nations.

Since the beginning of her musical career Marieme has performed around the United States including dates in New York City and Los Angeles.  Many of the shows are benefits to help those in her home continent of Africa. In November 2019, she performed at the Kick 4 Life Gala at the Angel Orensanz Center, with 100 percent of the proceeds donated to provide education to at-risk children in Lesotho, Southern Africa.

Back in Senegal, Marieme became known for the live performances she does with popular African musicians, Akon, Youssou N’Dour and Pape et Cheikh.

LinkedIn struck a deal with Marieme to create an anthem for the business site. Her version of the Cat Stevenssong, "Be What You Must, became part of their promotion beginning in November 2019.

The Marieme song, Rogue is one of several that are being played in the Apple TV+ television series Truth Be Told, which became available on the platform December 13, 2019. The song is also used in worldwide TV and Digital commercials about the show.

BlackBook named the song and video for "Ask For Help" as one of BlackBook's Best Song + Video Premieres of 2019.

In 2019, Marieme shot a video for her track, "Lovechild", during the New York WorldPride celebrations. The track promotes the promotion of protection for black trans lives.

References

Senegalese people of Mauritanian descent
Women singer-songwriters
Living people
University at Buffalo alumni
1988 births